Marius Müller (born 12 July 1993) is a German professional footballer who plays as a goalkeeper for FC Luzern.

Club career
Müller joined 1. FC Kaiserslautern in 2002 from TV 1883 Lampertheim. He made his 2. Bundesliga debut at 11 May 2014 against Fortuna Düsseldorf in a 4–2 away loss.

In June 2016, he moved to RB Leipzig agreeing to a three-contract. The transfer fee paid to Kaiserslautern was reported as about €1.7 million. In July 2017, Müller returned to 1. FC Kaiserslautern from RB Leipzig, on a one-year loan.

Career statistics

References

External links

1993 births
Living people
Association football goalkeepers
German footballers
Germany youth international footballers
2. Bundesliga players
Regionalliga players
Swiss Super League players
1. FC Kaiserslautern II players
1. FC Kaiserslautern players
RB Leipzig players
FC Luzern players
German expatriate footballers
German expatriate sportspeople in Switzerland
Expatriate footballers in Switzerland